Zulkifli Abbas (born 2 March 1956) is a Malaysian field hockey player. He competed at the 1984 Summer Olympics in Los Angeles, where the Malaysian team placed 11th.

References

External links

1956 births
Living people
Malaysian people of Malay descent
Malaysian male field hockey players
Olympic field hockey players of Malaysia
Field hockey players at the 1984 Summer Olympics
Asian Games medalists in field hockey
Field hockey players at the 1982 Asian Games
Asian Games bronze medalists for Malaysia
Medalists at the 1982 Asian Games